Hamburger SV nearly qualified for the Champions League, only just falling short to Borussia Dortmund. Given that HSV had been mired in the midfield for the last few seasons, the season was regarded as a successful one.

Players

First-team squad
Squad at end of season

Left club during season

Competitions

Bundesliga

League table

Matches 
 Hamburg-Hannover 2–1
 0–1 Dariusz Żuraw 
 1–1 Jörg Albertz 
 2–1 Jörg Albertz 
 SV Werder Bremen-Hamburg 2–1
 1–0 Angelos Charisteas (9)
 1–1 Tomáš Ujfaluši (20)
 2–1 Holger Wehlage (50)
 Hamburg-Bayern Munich 0–3
 0–1 Claudio Pizarro (25)
 0–2 Claudio Pizarro (85)
 0–3 Alexander Zickler (88)
 Wolfsburg-Hamburg 2–1
 1–0 Stefan Effenberg (51 pen)
 1–1 Roda Antar (71)
 2–1 Hans Sarpei (83)
 Hamburg-Kaiserslautern 2–0
 1–0 Bernardo Romeo (66)
 2–0 Bernardo Romeo (77)
 Hertha BSC-Hamburg 2–0
 1–0 Marcelinho (50)
 2–0 Bart Goor (52)
 Hamburg-Stuttgart 3–2
 0–1 Jochen Seitz (9)
 1–1 Bernardo Romeo (14)
 2–1 Sergej Barbarez (22)
 2–2 Alexander Hleb (25)
 3–2 Bernardo Romeo (86)
 Schalke 04-Hamburg 3–0
 1–0 Victor Agali (9)
 2–0 Ebbe Sand (15)
 3–0 Gerald Asamoah (45)
 Hamburg-Mönchengladbach 1–0
 1–0 Erik Meijer (47)
 Arminia Bielefeld-Hamburg 2–1
 1–0 Mamadou Diabang (14)
 2–0 Mamadou Diabang (57)
 2–1 Erik Meijer (66)
 Borussia Dortmund-Hamburg 1–1
 1–0 Tomáš Rosický (68)
 1–1 Kim Christensen (88)
 Hamburg-1860 Munich 1–0
 1–0 Bernardo Romeo (29)
 Nürnberg-Hamburg 1–3
 0–1 Sergej Barbarez (26)
 1–1 Saša Ćirić (40 pen)
 1–2 Marcel Maltritz (51)
 1–3 Bernardo Romeo (66)
 Hamburg-Energie Cottbus 1–1
 1–0 Rodolfo Cardoso (47)
 1–1 Andrzej Juskowiak (90)
 Bayer Leverkusen-Hamburg 2–3
 0–1 Bernardo Romeo (3)
 1–1 Hanno Balitsch (11)
 2–1 Yıldıray Baştürk (21)
 2–2 Bernardo Romeo (52)
 2–3 Sergej Barbarez (76)
 Hamburg-Bochum 1–1
 1–0 Sergej Barbarez (56)
 1–1 Peter Graulund (90)
 Hansa Rostock-Hamburg 0–0
 Hannover-Hamburg 2–2
 1–0 Fredi Bobić (40)
 2–0 Mohamadou Idrissou (50)
 2–1 Tomáš Ujfaluši (63)
 2–2 Erik Meijer (78)
 Hamburg-Werder Bremen 1–0
 1–0 Sergej Barbarez (56)
 Bayern Munich-Hamburg 1–1
 1–0 Claudio Pizarro (11)
 1–1 Naohiro Takahara (90)
 Hamburg-Wolfsburg 2–0
 1–0 Rodolfo Cardoso (38)
 2–0 Collin Benjamin (90)
 Kaiserslautern-Hamburg 2–0
 1–0 Vratislav Lokvenc (51)
 2–0 Miroslav Klose (57)
 Hamburg-Hertha BSC 1–0
 1–0 Nico-Jan Hoogma (56)
 Stuttgart-Hamburg 1–1
 1–0 Kevin Kurányi (20)
 1–1 Mehdi Mahdavikia (43)
 Hamburg-Schalke 04 3–1
 1–0 Bernardo Romeo (29)
 1–1 Marco van Hoogdalem (57)
 2–1 Naohiro Takahara (85)
 3–1 Bernardo Romeo (90)
 Mönchengladbach-Hamburg 2–0
 1–0 Mikael Forssell (6)
 2–0 Marcelo Pletsch (55)
 Hamburg-Arminia Bielefeld 1–0
 1–0 Bastian Reinhardt (10 og)
 Hamburg-Borussia Dortmund 1–1
 1–0 Bernardo Romeo (65)
 1–1 Jan Koller (68)
 1860 Munich-Hamburg 1–1
 1–0 Martin Max (36)
 1–1 Milan Fukal (65)
 Hamburg-Nürnberg 4–0
 1–0 Milan Fukal (36)
 2–0 Bernardo Romeo (43)
 3–0 Mehdi Mahdavikia (55)
 4–0 Naohiro Takahara (76)
 Energie Cottbus-Hamburg 0–0
 Hamburg-Bayer Leverkusen 4–1
 1–0 Sergej Barbarez (18)
 2–0 Bernardo Romeo (55)
 2–1 Hanno Balitsch (88)
 3–1 Lars Jacobsen (90)
 4–1 Erik Meijer (90)
 Bochum-Hamburg 1–1
 1–0 Thomas Christiansen (31)
 1–1 Christian Rahn (82)
 Hamburg-Hansa Rostock 2–0
 1–0 Rodolfo Cardoso (45)
 2–0 Bernardo Romeo (53)

References

Notes

Hamburger SV seasons
Hamburg